The 1930 Drake Bulldogs football team was an American football team that represented Drake University in the Missouri Valley Conference (MVC) during the 1930 college football season. In its tenth season under head coach Ossie Solem, the team compiled a 5–4 record (3–0 against MVC opponents), tied for the MVC championship, and outscored all opponents by a total of 166 to 120.

Quarterback Lynn King was the team captain. Other key players included halfback Chuck Van Koten.

Schedule

References

Drake
Drake Bulldogs football seasons
Missouri Valley Conference football champion seasons
Drake Bulldogs football